Damir Memišević (born 22 January 1984) is a Bosnian-Herzegovinian retired professional footballer who played as a centre back or defensive midfielder.

Club career
Born in Banja Luka, Memišević started his career in his hometown with the local club FK Borac Banja Luka. He showed his quality at very young age, having already played some senior matches, so he was transferred to SV Werder Bremen. He was not selected for the first team, and after a few years with the amateur squad he decided to return to Bosnia-Herzegovina, where he was a regular starter in FK Željezničar in the 2005–06 season. In January 2007 he signed a contract with FC Terek Grozny in the Russian First Division where Memišević made 32 league appearances. In January 2009, he returned to FK Željezničar.

International career
He was a part of the Bosnia-Herzegovina Under 21 team until 2006.

References

External links
 
 

1984 births
Living people
Sportspeople from Banja Luka
Association football central defenders
Association football midfielders
Bosnia and Herzegovina footballers
Bosnia and Herzegovina under-21 international footballers
SV Werder Bremen II players
FK Željezničar Sarajevo players
FC Akhmat Grozny players
FK Sloboda Tuzla players
FK Laktaši players
FC Taraz players
FK BSK Banja Luka players
Premier League of Bosnia and Herzegovina players
Russian First League players
Kazakhstan Premier League players
First League of the Republika Srpska players
Bosnia and Herzegovina expatriate footballers
Expatriate footballers in Germany
Bosnia and Herzegovina expatriate sportspeople in Germany
Expatriate footballers in Russia
Bosnia and Herzegovina expatriate sportspeople in Russia
Expatriate footballers in Kazakhstan
Bosnia and Herzegovina expatriate sportspeople in Kazakhstan